Wallace Brown was a college football player for coach Dutch Stanley's Florida Gators in 1933 and 1934. He was second-team All-SEC in 1934.

References

American football quarterbacks
Florida Gators football players
American football halfbacks
Players of American football from St. Petersburg, Florida